Muhammad Shah was the third monarch of the Sayyid dynasty which ruled the Delhi Sultanate.

Life 
He succeeded his uncle, Mubarak Shah to the throne. Both Muhammad Shah and his son, Alam Shah who succeeded him, were supplanted by the Lodi dynasty. Muhammad Shah mostly spent his reign going on hunting expeditions and he eventually died in 1445 due to drinking too much alcohol.

Muhammad Shah's tomb is a notable monument within the Lodi Gardens of New Delhi.

Notes

References
 
 

Sayyid dynasty
1445 deaths
Indian people of Arab descent